Everybody Ought to Know may refer to:
"Everybody Ought to Know", a song by Stephanie Mills from Personal Inspirations, 1994
"Everybody Ought to Know", a song by London Parris 
"Everybody Ought to Know", a song by Take 6 from So Cool, 1998 
"Everybody Ought to Know", a song by Amy Allison recorded with the Maudlins from The Maudlin Years, 1996
"Everybody Ought to Know", a song by Wolfie from Awful Mess Mystery, 1999